Gustav Efraimsson (born 1980) is a Swedish songwriter and music producer.

Early life
Efraimsson grew up on the Swedish west coast, in a town called Gothenburg. He later moved to Stockholm, the capital of Sweden and a major source of worldwide hits from songwriters like Max Martin, Shellback, RedOne and Anders Bagge.

Musical career
He has written songs for major recording artists like NKOTBSB (New Kids On The Block & Backstreet Boys), Snoop Dogg, 'Anouk, September, Marta Sánchez, Jennifer Rush, Sweetbox, Audio Playground, Edurne, Sweet California, Eric Saade as well as many others.
In 2016 his song "We Are Your Tomorrow" was chosen to be in the Melodifestivalen 2016 (the Swedish qualifier for Eurovision Song Contest 2016) and made it all the way to final, held at Friends Arena on March 12.

Selected discography

Alexie Divello
Got This Feeling feat. Saco Bear

Alisa
Rock Ur Body

Anouk
 Be My Baby
 Keeps Getting Better

Anniela
 Crescendo
 Sin Of My Own
Aitor Saez
 A Pleno Sol

Audio Playground
 Emergency (feat. Snoop Dogg) (#13 US Billboard Dance/Club)
 Hands Up In The Air (#1 US Billboard Dance/Club)

Axel Schylström
 Tagen På Sängen

Beatrice
 Electroshock

Beatrix Kiddo
 Swipe

Camp Sweden
 Kämpa Gul och Blå (feat. Ola Lustig)

Carina Dahl
 It Gets Better

David Lindgren
 We Are Your Tomorrow (Melodifestivalen 2016 finalist)

Deep
 People In The Plan

Super Junior Donghae & Eunhyuk
 Android Syndrome (#1 Oricon Album Chart Japan / #1 Oricon DVD Chart Japan)

Edurne 
 Despierta (#3 Spain album chart, #5 Spain singles chart)
 No Mirar Atras (producer/mixer)
 Te Falta Veneno (producer/mixer)

Eric Saade 
 Say It (#2 Sweden Album Chart)

Eric Suen
 Party Life (feat. Mike Kasem)

Fanclub
 Henrik Larsson

Fatin
 Saat Ku Gelap Saat Ku Remang (#1 Indonesian Album Chart, 10× platinum)

GAC (Gamaliel Audrey Cantika)
 Goooo
 I Want You
 Kamu

Gille
 Winter Dream

Gita Gutawa
 It's Not Me, It's You
 Karenamu Bukan Aku
 Sunshine After Rain

Gloss
 Sempre Em Movimento

Han Geng 
 The One
 Wild Cursive (MTV EMA Winner x2, Grammy winner - Song Of The Year, China)

Inéz
 Listen To Your Heart

Jakob Karlberg
 Sluta Inte Dansa

Jennifer Rush
 Head Above Water

JLC
 Borta Bra Men Hemma Fest

John Park
 Imagine (#1 Korean Album Chart)

Josef Sedraia
 6
 Bababababa

Josefin Glenmark
 She's In My Head

Judika
 Sampai Kau Jadi Milikku (6× platinum album)
 Strong Together (6× platinum album)

Lisa Ajax
 Jag Vill Ha Dig

Maja Kristina

 Imma Show U
 No Fake Love

Malena Laszlo

 Gold Silver Diamonds and Pearls

Marta Sánchez
 Get Together (feat. D-MOL) (Official Bacardi International Campaign Song)

Matilda Thompson
 Ain't Waiting
 Elysium
 Run Back To The Fire
 What We Do

Moncho
 Karantän
 Skaka Ditt Paket

Moncho & Tarequito
 Djuret I Mig

Monsta X
 Secret

Nathalie Saba
 Young Hearts

NKOTBSB (New Kids On The Block & Backstreet Boys)
 All In My Head (#7 US Billboard 200)

Ofelia
 Criminal (from Jordskott TV series)

Ola Lustig
 M.I.L.F.
 Julraketen
 Låtsas Att Det Är Semester
 Netflix och Chill

Rio Febrian
 Matahari
 Rasa Sesungguhnya
 Run Away

Risa Hirako
 Epic
 Take Me

Sebastian Walldén 
 Bad News

Sean and Conor Price
 I Hate This

Seean
 It's Alright

September 
 Sin Of My Own

Shawn Lee
 Around The World

Sweet California 
 Good Lovin' (#1 Spain Singles Chart, #1 Spain Album Chart, Platinum certified)

Sweetbox 
 Magic

Tereza Kerndlova
 Monsters

The Fooo Conspiracy
 What The Fooo

Tooji
 CockTail

Victoria Tocca
 All I Am
 In Your Hand
 I Din Hand

Wiktoria

 I Won't Stand In Your Way (producer/mixer)

What's Up
 Out Of The Blue
 Stone Cold Sober
 Romeo (producer/mixer)

Yamashita Tomohisa 
 Blood Diamond (#1 Japan Album Chart)

Younha
 Joahae

Young Pharoz 
 Flying The Flag / Yalla Ben Ne3eesh (song for the World Cup 2014)

He has produced and/or mixed songs for many well known European and Asian artists, including September, Marta Sánchez, Edurne, Yamashita Tomohisa and more.

References

http://www.smff.se/?id=261&cid=3005

External links
Official Website

Living people
Swedish songwriters
Swedish record producers
1980 births